The fifth season of Will & Grace premiered on September 26, 2002 and concluded on May 15, 2003. It consisted of 24 episodes.

Cast and characters

Main cast 
 Eric McCormack as Will Truman
 Debra Messing as Grace Adler
 Megan Mullally as Karen Walker
 Sean Hayes as Jack McFarland
 Shelley Morrison as Rosario Salazar

Recurring cast 
 Harry Connick Jr. as Dr. Marvin "Leo" Markus
 Tim Bagley as Larry
 Jerry Levine as Joe
 Tom Gallop as Rob
 Leigh-Allyn Baker as Ellen
 Michael Angarano as Elliott
 Minnie Driver as Lorraine Finster
 Leslie Jordan as Beverley Leslie
 Marshall Manesh as Mr. Zamir

Special guest stars 
 Rip Torn as Lionel Banks
 Kevin Bacon as himself
 Gene Wilder as Mr. Stein
 Eileen Brennan as Zandra
 Tom Skerritt as Dr. Jay Markus
 Judith Ivey as Eleanor Markus
 Debbie Reynolds as Bobbi Adler
 Katie Couric as herself
 Elton John as himself
 Andy Garcia as Milo
 Seth MacFarlane as Pencil Sharpener (voice)
 Demi Moore as Sissy Palmer-Ginsburg
 Madonna as Liz
 Macaulay Culkin as Jason Towne
 Nicollette Sheridan as Dr. Danielle Morty

Guest stars 
 Laura Kightlinger as Nurse Sheila
 Mary Beth McDonough as Mom
 Reginald VelJohnson as Dr. Kaplan
 Jason Marsden as Kim
 Emily Rutherfurd as Joanne
 Ethan Sandler as Doctor
 Matthew Glave as Kirk
 Dan Futterman as Barry
 Rosanna Arquette as Julie
 Kathleen Wilhoite as Sally
 Bruno Campos as Anton
 Steven W. Bailey as Vin
 Clark Gregg as Cameron
 Jamie Kaler as Gary

Episodes

References

5
2002 American television seasons
2003 American television seasons
Television episodes directed by James Burrows